Pyrrhulina zigzag is a species of fish in the Pyrrhulina genus found in the upper Amazon basin. They grow no more than a few centimeters.

References

External links
 

Fish described in 2001
Taxa named by Axel Zarske
Taxa named by Jacques Géry
Lebiasinidae
Fish of South America